Duane Lundy is a producer, sound engineer, and musician based in Lexington, Kentucky.  He is best known for his work with artists such as Jim James, Ringo Starr, Vandaveer, Sturgill Simspon (including with Sunday Valley), Ancient Warfare, Joe Pug, Ben Sollee, Miles Nielsen and the Rusted Hearts, and Justin Wells. Lundy has also worked with WUKY (Red Barn Radio), Young Mary Records, Colter Wall, Abby Hamilton, Bela Fleck, Shooter Jennings, Lance Rogers, David Jameson, Ian Noe, and Justin Payne. He owns and operates the Lexington Recording Company (formerly Shangri-La Productions) recording studio in Lexington, KY, and is a partner in the WhiteSpace Records recording label.

References 

Coroneos, Kyle. "Album Review – Justin Wells – “The United State”. Saving Country Music. Retrieved 23 April 2021.

Year of birth missing (living people)
Living people